Sreshth Movies is an Indian film production and distribution company mostly producing Telugu films. The movie banner is owned by actor Nithiin Reddy and family. It is chiefly produced by Actor Nithiin with his father Sudhakar Reddy and his sister Nikitha Reddy.

History
The banner has produced many Telugu films such as Ishq, Gunde Jaari Gallanthayyinde, Chinnadana Nee Kosam and Akhil. Shresth movies along with Global films have acquired the Telugu dubbed version rights of this film for Suriya Sivakumar starrer Tamil film 24 (2016). They bought the rights for the 2018 Hindi film Andhadhun in which Nithiin play the role of Ayushmann Khurrana titled Maestro (2021) released through Disney+ Hotstar.

In 2022, they acquired the Telugu dubbed version rights of Kamal Haasan starrer Tamil film Vikram released in June 2022.

Macherla Niyojakavargam is their upcoming film starring Nithiin and Krithi Shetty, written and directed by MS Raja Shekhar Reddy and produced by Sudhakar Reddy and Nikitha Reddy under the banner of Sreshth.The film is scheduled to be released in theatres on 8 July 2022, along with this the banner also announced a new project starring Nithiin and directed by Vakkantham Vamsi under the working title Nithiin32.

Production

Distribution

References

External links 
 
 
 

Film production companies based in Hyderabad, India
Year of establishment missing